The IV CELAC summit or 2016 CELAC summit was the fourth ordinary heads of state summit of the Community of Latin American and Caribbean States. It was held on 26 and 27 January 2016 in Quito, Ecuador.

References

External links 
 Official declaration
 Official declaration  (Spanish)

2016 conferences
2016 in international relations
2016 in South America
2016 in the Caribbean
Diplomatic conferences in Ecuador
Summit,2016